What You Hear Is What You Get – Live at Carnegie Hall is a live album by Ike & Tina Turner released on United Artists Records in 1971.

Recording and release 
What You Hear Is What You Get – Live at Carnegie Hall is a live recording of Ike & Tina Turner's doubleheader at the Carnegie Hall in New York City on April 1, 1971. The second show carried on into the early hours of April 2. Musician Fats Domino was the opening act.

In addition to Ike Turner-penned songs, the album includes interpretations of songs from Otis Redding, Sly Stone and the Family Stone, the Rolling Stones and their latest hit at the time, "Proud Mary" by Creedence Clearwater Revival. The album was released three months after the concert in July 1971. It reached No. 7 on the Billboard Soul LPs chart and No. 25 on the Top LPs chart. It was certified Gold by the RIAA in 1972.

What You Hear Is What You Get – Live at Carnegie Hall was the subject of the TV special Faberge Album of the Month, a series which featured "top contemporary recording artists and their hit LP's."

Critical reception 

The album was chosen as Pick of the Week for Record World magazine.

Record World (July 3, 1971): "This boisterous two-record volume is what a Carnegie Hall audience got live not too long ago. When those who have paid their dues are discussed, Ike and Tina just about head the list. Tops."

Billboard (July 3, 1971): This 2 record set of the Ike & Tina Turner revue's recent Carnegie Hall concert only hints at the charge of excitement generated by the Ikettes, Ike, and, especially Tina Turner before the capacity crowd. "Proud Mary," "Honky Tonk Women," "Ooh Poo Pah Doo," and excitingly visual "I've Been Loving You Too Long," suggests the frenzied entertainment they provided.

Reissues 
What You Hear Is What You Get – Live at Carnegie Hall was reissued on CD by EMI Records in 1996. In 2012, it was digitally remastered and released on CD by BGO Records.

Track listing

Chart performance

Certification and sales

References 

1971 live albums
Ike & Tina Turner live albums
Albums produced by Ike Turner
United Artists Records live albums
Live funk rock albums